The Stalking Protection Act 2019 (c. 9) is an Act of Parliament put forward as a private member's bill by then Conservative MP Sarah Wollaston which creates a civil protection order to prevent stalking.

Background 
In 2012, the Government amended the Protection from Harassment Act 1997 to introduce two new stalking offences, however, there were little protections where the perpetrator is not a partner or ex-partner, with this act aiming to address these concerns.

The Crime Survey for England and Wales reports that more than 1 in 5 women and nearly 1 in 10 men aged 16 to 59 have been victims of stalking since the age of 16. In 2017 to 2018 there were 1,616 prosecutions commenced under stalking offences, with 73% related to domestic abuse.

References 

Law enforcement in the United Kingdom
United Kingdom Acts of Parliament 2019
2019 in British law